This is a list of all captains of the Adelaide Football Club, an Australian rules football club in the Australian Football League and AFL Women's.

AFL

AFL Women's

References

Adelaide Football Club Honour Roll

Adelaide Football Club captains
Adelaide